Lasiomerus is a genus of damsel bugs in the family Nabidae. There are at least four described species in Lasiomerus.

Species
These four species belong to the genus Lasiomerus:
 Lasiomerus andabata Kerzhner, 1992 i c g
 Lasiomerus annulatus (Reuter, 1872) i c g b
 Lasiomerus constrictus (Champion, 1899) i c g
 Lasiomerus spinicrus (Reuter, 1890) i c g
Data sources: i = ITIS, c = Catalogue of Life, g = GBIF, b = Bugguide.net

References

Further reading

External links

 

Nabidae
Articles created by Qbugbot